The canton of Le Blanc is an administrative division of the Indre department, central France. Its borders were modified at the French canton reorganisation which came into effect in March 2015. Its seat is in Le Blanc.

It consists of the following communes:
 
Azay-le-Ferron
Le Blanc
Ciron
Concremiers
Douadic
Fontgombault
Ingrandes
Lingé
Lurais
Lureuil
Martizay
Mérigny
Mézières-en-Brenne
Néons-sur-Creuse
Obterre
Paulnay
Pouligny-Saint-Pierre
Preuilly-la-Ville
Rosnay
Ruffec
Saint-Aigny
Sainte-Gemme
Saint-Michel-en-Brenne
Saulnay
Sauzelles
Tournon-Saint-Martin
Villiers

References

Cantons of Indre